"Risingson" is a song by the English trip hop group Massive Attack, released as a single on 7 July 1997. It is the first single from their third album, Mezzanine (1998), and the eighth single overall.

Background and composition
The single contains a sample of "I Found a Reason", a song by The Velvet Underground.

Reception
Reception for the song was positive. John Bush of AllMusic described the song as "a dense, dark feature for Massive Attack themselves (on production as well as vocals), with a kitchen sink's worth of dubby effects and reverb." British magazine Music Week rated it four out of five, adding, "Moody, dark atmospherics with prowling bass and gruff raps that suggests a darker approach for the Bristol trio's third LP."

Music video
The accompanying music video for "Risingson" stars all the participating musicians in Mezzanine, excluding the guest singers. They are all in a house while a gimped man with a chainsaw is outside the house. Robert del Naja walks to a window to investigate the man, who is on the other side of the window, but he soon disappears as Del Naja spots him. Del Naja walks and leaves to head upstairs, until he notices the man again and decides to jump down the stairs. He tries to find the man's approximate location outside, but he is already sawing the back door down, near where Mushroom is located. He walks inside and follows Mushroom. Daddy G then walks to the front door and leaves the house, while Del Naja is in another room and spots another person outside climbing the walls. He sits down when there is an explosion behind him.

Along with all the other music videos released with Mezzanine, the video was directed by Walter Stern.

Personnel
Massive Attack
 Robert Del Naja – vocals, producer, arrangements, programming, keyboards, guitars, samples, art direction, design
 Grantley Marshall – vocals, producer, arrangements, programming, keyboards, samples
 Andrew Vowles – producer, arrangements, programming, keyboards, samples

Additional personnel
 Neil Davidge – producer, arrangements, programming, keyboards, samples
 Angelo Bruschini – guitars
 Jon Harris, Bob Locke, Winston Blisset – bass guitars
 Andy Gangadeen – drums
 Dave Jenkins, Michael Timothy – additional keyboards

Recording personnel
 Jan Kybert – ProTools
 Lee Shepherd – engineer (Massive Attack and Christchurch Studios)
 Mark "Spike" Stent – mixing (Olympic Studios)
 Jan Kybert, Paul "P-Dub" Walton – assistant mixing
 Tim Young – editing, engineer (Metropolis Studios)

Charts

References

1997 singles
Virgin Records singles
1997 songs
Massive Attack songs
Songs written by Daddy G
Songs written by Robert Del Naja
Songs written by Andrew Vowles
Music videos directed by Walter Stern